Aragokome was a town of ancient Phrygia, inhabited in Roman times.

Its site is located near Yapılcan in Asiatic Turkey.

References

Populated places in Phrygia
Former populated places in Turkey
Roman towns and cities in Turkey
History of Kütahya Province